Mount Brandon or Brandon, at , is one of the ten highest peaks in Ireland, being the 8th–highest peak in Ireland on the Arderin list, and the 9th–highest on the Vandeleur-Lynam list. Brandon is the highest Irish mountain outside the MacGillycuddy's Reeks range and has the greatest prominence of any Irish peak except Carrauntoohil, Ireland's highest mountain.

Mount Brandon is at the centre of a long high ridge called the Brandon Group range of mountains in the Dingle Peninsula in Kerry. The ridge contains seven other major peaks (i.e. above 2,000 ft in height); one is the similarly named Brandon Peak (840 metres). The positioning and dimensions of the Brandon Group ridge have made it the scene of several air accidents over the years. The mountain, and range, is named after Saint Brendan, and is the end of a Christian pilgrimage trail known as Cosán na Naomh. It is also well regarded for hill walking with routes such as the 4–5-hour Faha Route (also called The Pilgrim's Path), and the 6–7-hour traverse of the entire range known as "one of the finest ridgewalks in Ireland".

Geology

Brandon is composed of sandstone particles of various sizes collectively known as Old Red Sandstone. Old Red Sandstone has a purple–reddish colour, and has virtually no fossils. The colour gave its name to nearby Purple Mountain. The composition of Old Red Sandstone is variable and contains quartz stones, mudstones, siltstones, and sandstone particles (conglomerate rock boulders with quartz pebbles are visible). They are described by the Geological Survey of Ireland as the oldest Devonian rocks in Ireland.

Geography

As well as Mount Brandon, the Brandon Group ridge has seven other major classified peaks (see list below), including the similarly named Brandon Peak , Benagh , Faha Ridge , Gearhane , Masatiompan , Piaras Mór , and An Scraig .

The most distinctive aspect of the Brandon Group is the contrast between the gentle grassy slopes on its western side, and the sharp cliffs and deep corries of its eastern side; an effect that the Brandon Group's long north–south ridge exactly separates.
Mount Brandon owes its craggy shape to the work of glaciers during the ice age, which gouged out a series of corries on the eastern flank of the mountain. The summit of Mount Brandon is rounded and smooth as it was likely a nunatuk (like Lugnaquilla in Wicklow), and presents a stark contrast to Brandon Peak, or Barr an Ghéaráin, which is alpine in appearance.

On Brandon's deep eastern corrie, flanked by Faha Ridge to its north, is a series of rocky plateaus, each of which has a small paternoster lake; over ten lakes grow in size descending the mountain. From highest they are, the Locha Chom an Chnoic (Coumaknock Loughs), Loch na Lice (Lough Nalacken) and Loch Cruite (Lough Cruttia). This corrie's natural environment, and positioning on the Faha Route, means it is regularly photographed.

Brandon is the 340th–highest mountain, and 10th most prominent mountain, in Britain and Ireland, on the Simms classification. Brandon is regarded by the Scottish Mountaineering Club ("SMC") as one of 34 Furths, which is a mountain above  in elevation, and meets the other SMC criteria for a Munro (e.g. "sufficient separation"), but which is outside of (or furth) Scotland; Brandon is referred to as one of the 13 Irish Munros.

Brandon's prominence qualifies for the P600 classification. Both Brandon and Brandon Peak, meet the Britain and Ireland Marilyn classification. Brandon is the 3rd highest mountain, and Brandon Peak is the 9th highest mountain, in the MountainViews Online Database, 100 Highest Irish Mountains.

Naming

The mountain is called Brandon Mountain, Mount Brandon and Brandon on various maps.

Brandon takes its name from Saint Brendan the Navigator, or Bréanainn, who is said to have been born in what is now County Kerry in 484 AD, and is chiefly known for his legendary voyage in a boat of wood and leather to discover the "Isle of the Blessed", also called Saint Brendan's Island. In the story of Brendan's life (titled, the Beatha Bhréanainn, or the Latin version, the Vita Brendani), he spent three days fasting on the mountain before his voyage, was visited by an angel, and experienced a vision of "a great land to the west"; the mountain is described as being surrounded by the ocean, which fits with the topography of Mount Brandon.

Irish academic Paul Tempan wrote in his 2010 Irish Hill and Mountain Names, that it is likely that the mountain was a source of pilgrimage even before both St. Brendan and the arrival of Christianity altogether. Its importance may be due to the fact that, being so far west and so high, it is the place where the sun can be seen the latest as it sinks below the horizon. Tempan notes that the medieval story about Brendan's life calls the mountain Sliabh nDaidche in the Irish version, or Mons Aitche in the Latin version; and that the Irish academic Dr Alan Mac an Bhaird, had translated this as "mountain of Faithche", as Brandon stands in the Faha townland. However, some believe that the Mons Aitche name refers to Slieve Aughty, rather than to Mount Brandon.

Some sources link the name with the voyages of Bran mac Febail, however, this is considered less likely.

Hill walking

The route starts from the car park of Ballybrack, and follows the straight grassy path, marked by large crosses, to the summit of Mount Brandon; then retracing back to Ballybrack. The  route takes 3–4 hours. A longer 5-hour variation is to continue north along the summit ridge from Mount Brandon to Piaras Mor, and then descend to Ballyknockane.

A scenic variation is the  4–5-hour Faha Route, the Pilgrim's Path, which starts from the east via the car park at the Faha Grotto just outside Cloghane. The route to the summit is marked, and offers views of the deep corries and paternoster lakes on Brandon's glaciated east face. It follows a trail below the Faha Ridge to the summit; then retracing back to Faha Grotto.

The full ridge walk of the entire Mount Brandon range, regarded as "one of the finest ridge walks in Ireland", crosses the full  ridge of the Brandon Group from the Conor Pass to Masatiompan and takes 6–7 hours.

List of peaks

The following is a download from the MountainViews Online Database, who list 15 Brandon Group peaks over 100 metres.

Pilgrimage

Due to its link with Saint Brendan, the mountain is popular with Irish Catholic pilgrims. The mountain's relative height and status of being at an extreme westerly point appears to have been of great importance to Saint Brendan. A pilgrimage route called Cosán na Naomh ("The Saints Road") begins at Cill Mhic an Domhnaigh (Kilvickadowning) on Ventry Strand at the southern end of the Dingle peninsula, and ends at Séipéilín Bréanainn ("Brendan's Oratory") on Brandon's summit. Sáipéilín Bréanainn is the remains of a stone building believed to have been used by Saint Brendan. The path to the peak is marked by small white crosses and the peak itself is topped by a large metal cross. It is speculated the pilgrimage originated in pre-Christian times as a Lughnasadh ritual.

In 1997, the Irish Heritage Council set up the Pilgrim Paths Project to restore walking routes along Irish medieval pilgrimage paths. One of the routes chosen was Cosán na Naomh, and an 18–kilometre way-marked trail was constructed between Ventry Strand and the grotto at Ballybrack at the foot of Mount Brandon. The trail has been developed to the standard required by the Irish Sports Council for National Waymarked Trails in Ireland. For safety reasons, it was decided not to mark the trail to the end of the medieval route at the summit of Brandon, but to finish at Ballybrack. The starting point at Ventry is one of the places pilgrims would have come ashore. The trail passes a number of important ecclesiastical heritage sites including Gallarus Oratory and Kilmalkedar monastic site.

Aircraft accidents

Between 1940 and 1943 a number of Allied and Axis aircraft crashed on Brandon and the Faha Ridge.

 20 August 1940: A Luftwaffe Focke-Wulf Fw 200 Condor crash-landed on Faha Ridge, the crew of six survived and were the first known aircrew from Germany to land in Ireland during the Second World War. A plaque commemorating this event is on display in O'Connor's Bar and Guest House in Cloghane Village.
 28 July 1943: A BOAC Civilian Short Sunderland III Flying Boat crashed due to a navigation error onto the lower slopes of Mount Brandon while flying from West Africa to Foynes Flying Boat Base. Ten of the twenty-five on board were killed in the wreck. An anchor from the wreck is in O'Connor's Bar and Guest House.
 22 August 1943: A RAF Short Sunderland III Flying Boat belonging to 201 Squadron crashed while flying a patrol in the Atlantic, out of Castle Archdale. It crashed into the lower slopes of Mount Brandon. Eight of the crew of eleven were killed. A plaque commemorating those killed is in O'Connor's Bar and Guest House.
 20 December 1943: A RAF Vickers Wellington belonging to 304 Squadron based out of Predannack Airfield crashed directly into Mount Brandon. All of the six Polish crew members were killed. Engines from the wreck are also on display in O'Connor's Bar.

See also

List of Furth mountains in the British Isles
List of mountains of the British Isles by height
List of P600 mountains in the British Isles
Lists of mountains in Ireland
Mountains of the Central Dingle Peninsula, a mountain range in Dingle Peninsula
Slieve Mish Mountains, a mountain range in Dingle Peninsula

Notes

References

Bibliography

Climbing

Religious

External links
MountainViews: The Irish Mountain Website, Brandon
The Database of British and Irish Hills , the largest database of British Isles mountains ("DoBIH")
Hill Bagging UK & Ireland, the searchable interface for the DoBIH
Ordnance Survey Ireland ("OSI") Online Map Viewer
Logainm: Placenames Database of Ireland
Cosán na Naomh, Pilgrim's Route from Ventry Strand to Brandon Mountain

Brandon
Brandon
Brandon
Historic trails and roads in Ireland
Brandon
Brandon
Pilgrimage routes
Roman Catholic pilgrimage sites in Ireland